Gnomoniaceae is a family of fungi in the order Diaporthales. The family was circumscribed by German botanist Heinrich Georg Winter in 1886.

Genera
As accepted by GBIF: 

 Alnecium  (2)
 Ambarignomonia  (2)
 Anisogramma  (6)
 Anisomyces  (2)
 Apiognomonia  (32)
 Asteroma  (115)
 Bagcheea  (3)
 Ceuthocarpon (6) 
 Chondroplea  (1)
 Clypeoporthe  (5)
 Cryptoderis  (7)
 Cryptodiaporthe  (27)
 Cryptospora  (8)
 Cryptosporella  (45)
 Cylindrosporella (6)
 Cytodiplospora  (13)
 Depazea  (13)
 Diaporthella  (7)
 Diplacella  (2)
 Diplodina  (318)
 Diploplenodomopsis (7)
 Diplosclerophoma (2)
 Discosporium  (10)
 Discula  (41)
 Ditopella  (14)
 Ditopellopsis  (4)
 Fioriella (1)
 Flavignomonia  (1)
 Gloeosporidina  (6)
 Gloeosporidium (6)
 Gnomonia  (145)
 Gnomoniella  (34)
 Gnomoniopsis  (40)
 Greeneria  (4)
 Laestadia  (33)
 Ligniella (3)
 Linospora  (23)
 Mamiania  (1)
 Mamianiella  (3)
 Marsupiomyces  (3)
 Melanopelta (1)
 Millerburtonia  (1)
 Neognomoniopsis  (2
 Neomarssoniella  (1)
 Occultocarpon  (2)
 Ophiognomonia  (92)
 Ophiovalsa  (4)
 Phragmoporthe  (3)
 Phylloporthe  (1)
 Plagiostoma  (86)
 Plagiostomella (1)
 Pleuroceras  (23)
 Radulum  (11)
 Rehmiella  (1)
 Rostrocoronophora  (2)
 Septomyxa  (13)
 Sirococcus  (35)
 Skottsbergiella  (1)
 Spataporthe  (1)
 Stegastroma (1)
 Titaeosporina  (1)
 Uniseta  (1)
 Valseutypella (4)
 Winterella (3)
 Xenotypa  (1)

Figures in brackets are approx. how many species per genus.

Formerly Lambro and Uleoporthe are now in family Sydowiellaceae.

References

 
Ascomycota families
Diaporthales